Amores Cruzados (Crossed Hearts) is a telenovela produced by TV Azteca and Caracol TV Internacional. It premiered in 2006. The protagonists are David Zepeda, Michel Gurfi, Ana Lucia Dominguez and Patricia Vasquez. The telenovela was filmed in Mexico and Colombia.

Cast

Main cast
Ana Lucía Domínguez.... María
Michel Gurfi.... Alejandro
Patricia Vásquez.... Elisa
David Zepeda.... Diego

Primary cast
 Evangelina Elizondo.... Sara
 Patricia Bernal.... Fabiola
 Fernando Ciangherotti.... Federico

Secondary cast

References

External links
 Azteca Novelas
 Amores cruzados in Colarte

2006 telenovelas
2006 Colombian television series debuts
2007 Colombian television series endings
2006 Mexican television series debuts
2007 Mexican television series endings
Mexican telenovelas
Colombian telenovelas
TV Azteca telenovelas
Caracol Televisión telenovelas
Spanish-language telenovelas
Television shows set in Mexico City
Television shows set in Cartagena, Colombia